Tazewell is an unincorporated community and census-designated place (CDP) in Marion County, in the U.S. state of Georgia.

It was first listed as a CDP in the 2020 census, with a population of 93.

History
A post office called Tazewell was established in 1837, and remained in operation until 1985. The community was named after Henry Tazewell, a United States senator from Virginia, state legislator and judge. Tazewell was named the county seat of Marion County in 1838. The Old Marion County Courthouse still stands at Tazewell and was added to the National Register of Historic Places on September 18, 1980.

A variant spelling was "Tazwell" (without the E). The Georgia General Assembly incorporated the place as the "Town of Tazwell" in 1854. Tazewell today is an unincorporated area.

Geography
Tazewell is in eastern Marion County, in the valley of Shoal Creek. State Routes 137 and 24 cross in the center of town. SR 137 leads southwest  to Buena Vista, the county seat, and northeast  to Butler, while SR 240 leads east  to Oglethorpe and north  to Geneva.

Shoal Creek and Gin Creek join at the southern edge of the community to form Buck Creek, which flows east to the Flint River at Oglethorpe.

Demographics

2020 census

Note: the US Census treats Hispanic/Latino as an ethnic category. This table excludes Latinos from the racial categories and assigns them to a separate category. Hispanics/Latinos can be of any race.

References

Former municipalities in Georgia (U.S. state)
Census-designated places in Marion County, Georgia
Unincorporated communities in Marion County, Georgia